Xia Xi (17 August 1901 – 28 February 1936), also known as Man Bo and Lao Xia, was an early leader of the Chinese Communist Party and a member of the 28 Bolsheviks.

Biography 
Xia was born in Yiyang, Hunan Province. He studied at Yiyang Primary School, and met Mao Zedong in August 1917 when he enrolled into the Hunan First Normal University. During the May Fourth Movement in 1919, he participated in anti-Japanese boycotts and demonstrations. Xia was one of the first members of the CCP, joining the party in 1921. During the First United Front, Xia concurrently joined the Kuomintang and was involved in the organization of the Kuomintang Hunan provincial headquarters. In the 1926 he was appointed as an alternate member of the Central Executive Committee following the 2nd National Congress of Kuomintang. In the same year, Xia and others such as Guo Liang participated in the Northern Expedition as the Hunan provincial secretaries.

In May 1927, he was appointed as the Hunan Provincial Party Secretary and on 1 August participated in the Nanchang Uprising. Following which, Xia met Wang Ming and joined the 28 Bolsheviks during his further studies in the Moscow Sun Yat-sen University. In January 1931, he was elected as an alternate member of the Central Committee of the Chinese Communist Party.

Xia was sent the Hunan-Hubei Soviet in March 1931 to take over from Deng Zhongxia and was also appointed political commissar of the Second Red Army. Xia initiated purges in 1932, which led to thousands (approximately forty thousand Red Army soldiers were killed under Xia's orders throughout his entire lifespan) being purged and including 27 cadres whom were close associates of He Long.

In August 1932, Xia embarked on another purge, and though the number of people purged was unrecorded, the number of cadres purged stands at a high number of 241. Xia carried out another purge in 1933, including the purge of the Hunan Red Army founders and  leaders Duan Dechang, Wang Bingnan, and Liu Zhixun. Before the completion of the third purge, Xia Xi started the fourth round of purges in June 1933, resulting to the deaths of more than 3000 cadres. Although Xia held the  role of Political Commissar for only 2 years, he had purged tens and thousands of Red Army soldiers and party cadres.

In June 1935, Xia admitted his error of intensifying purges during the Hunan-Hubei Branch Meeting and rendezvoused with Red Sixth Army's Ren Bishi in October. As he was repentant about his misconduct during the purges, he was appointed a member of the Hunan-Hubei Provincial Committee and Vice-Chairman and member of the military branch of the Revolutionary Committee. In November 1935, Xia participated in the Long March.

On 28 February 1936, Xia Xi fell into the water due to fatigue on the way of crossing the Bijie river. Due to the deaths Xia had caused during the purges years ago, the Red Army soldiers did not rescue him and he consequently drowned.

References 
 夏曦主持“肃反”杀人无数 行军途中落水无人救
 李乔，揭秘：滥杀红军将士的夏曦 (Invalid URL), 中国共产党新闻网, 2011年01月04日

1901 births
1936 deaths
Deaths by drowning
Moscow Sun Yat-sen University alumni
Whampoa Military Academy alumni
People from Yiyang